Crassivesica is a genus of moths of the family Noctuidae. This genus was discovered by Crassivesica Hardwick in 1970.

Species
 Crassivesica bocha (Morrison, 1874)

References

Natural History Museum Lepidoptera genus database
Crassivesica at funet

Noctuinae